This is a list of the first minority male lawyers and judges in Washington, D.C. It includes the year in which the men were admitted to practice law (in parentheses). Also included are men who achieved other distinctions such becoming the first in their state to graduate from law school or become a political figure.

Firsts in the federal district's history

Law School 

 Yasimori Asada: First Japanese male student to enroll at the Georgetown University School of Law (1877) [Washington, D.C.]
 Winston A. Douglas, Elmer W. Henderson, William D. Martin and Lutrelle F. Parke: First African American male students to enroll at the Georgetown University School of Law (1948) [Washington, D.C.]
 Albert T. Gonzales (1935): First blind male to graduate from Georgetown University School of Law [Washington, D.C.]

Lawyer 

 George Boyer Vashon (1869): First African American male lawyer in Washington, D.C.

Judicial Officers

Justice of the Peace 

 John A. Moss: First African American male Justice of the Peace in Washington, D.C. (1873)

Judges 

Robert Heberton Terrell (1893): First African American male judge in Washington, D.C.
Spottswood William Robinson III (1939): First African American male serve on the U.S. Court of Appeals for the District of Columbia Circuit (1966) and the Chief Justice of the District of Columbia Circuit (1981)
Austin L. Fickling: First African American to serve on the District of Columbia Court of Appeals (1968)
William B. Bryant (1939): First African American male appointed as the Chief Judge of the U.S. District Court for the District of Columbia (1977)
David S. Tatel (1966): First blind male to serve on the U.S. Court of Appeals for the District of Columbia Circuit (1994)
 Theodore Roosevelt Newman Jr. (1958): First African American male appointed as the Chief judge of the Washington Court of Appeals (1976)
Ricardo M. Urbina (1970): First Latino American male judge in Washington, D.C. (1981). He would later become a district court judge.
Maurice B. Foley: First African American male to serve as a Judge of the United States Tax Court (1995)
Amit P. Mehta (1997): First Asian Pacific American male serve on the U.S. District Court for the District of Columbia (2013)
Sri Srinivasan (1995): First South Asian American male serve on the U.S. Court of Appeals for the District of Columbia Circuit (2013) and serve as its Chief Judge (2020)

Attorney General 

 Karl Racine: First Haitian-born American male elected as the Attorney General of the District of Columbia (2010)

United States Attorney 

 Eric Holder (1976): First African American male to serve as the United States Attorney for the District of Columbia (1993-1997)

Assistant United States Attorney 

 William B. Bryant (1939): First African American male as the Assistant United States Attorney for the District of Columbia (1951-1954)

Bar Association 

 Charles Duncan: First African American male to serve as the President of the D.C. Bar Association
 Darrell G. Mottley: First Hispanic American male to serve as the President of the D.C. Bar Association (2011)

Faculty 

 Viet D. Dinh: First Vietnamese American law professor tenured at Georgetown University

See also 

 List of first minority male lawyers and judges in the United States

Other topics of interest 

 List of first women lawyers and judges in the United States
 List of first women lawyers and judges in Washington D.C. (Federal District)

References 

 
Minority, West Virginia, first
Minority, West Virginia, first
Legal history of the District of Columbia
Lists of people from Washington, D.C.